USA Action Extreme Team was a children's television programming block on USA Network from 1995 to 1998. The block aired on Sunday mornings, but it later expanded to weekday mornings beginning in 1996 and took over the USA Cartoon Express block's timeslots as a result. The block ended on September 11, 1998, when the network permanently removed children's programming.

Shows

Original programs 
Exosquad (1995–1996)
Savage Dragon (1995–1998)
Street Fighter (1995–1998)
Mortal Kombat: Defenders of the Realm (1996–1998)
Wing Commander Academy (1996–1998)

Acquired programs 
Adventures of Sonic the Hedgehog (1995–1997)
Highlander: The Animated Series (1995–1996)
Sonic the Hedgehog (SatAM) (1995–1997)
The Superman/Batman Adventures (1995–1996)
WildC.A.T.s (1995–1996)
The Adventures of Super Mario Bros. 3 (1996–1997)
Double Dragon (1996–1998)
Mighty Max (1996–1998)
Super Mario World (1996–1997)
Street Sharks (1996–1997)
The Super Mario Bros. Super Show! (1996–1997)
Ultraforce (1996–1998)
Sailor Moon (1997–1998)

External links

 
USA Network original programming
Television programming blocks in the United States